Sir Nicholas Grattan-Doyle, DL (18 August 1862 – 14 July 1941), of The Manor House, Birtley, County Durham (now Tyne and Wear), was a Unionist Party politician in the United Kingdom.

He contested the January 1910 General Election as Liberal Unionist candidate for Gateshead, finishing second. On 27 July 1915, Grattan-Doyle was appointed a deputy lieutenant of County Durham. He was elected as Member of Parliament (MP) for Newcastle upon Tyne North at the 1918 general election, and held the seat until his resignation in 1940, aged 78, the age he was when he died the following year.

External links

References

1862 births
1941 deaths
Conservative Party (UK) MPs for English constituencies
UK MPs 1918–1922
UK MPs 1922–1923
UK MPs 1923–1924
UK MPs 1924–1929
UK MPs 1929–1931
UK MPs 1931–1935
UK MPs 1935–1945
Deputy Lieutenants of Durham